Sachie Ishizu (Ishizu Sachie) is a former professional tennis player from Japan.

Tennis career
She was runner-up in the girls' singles event of the 2010 Wimbledon Championships and reached a highest ranking of No. 5 on the ITF Junior Circuit. Following her junior career, she chose to attend the University of Tsukuba but decided in 2013 to take a leave of absence to focus on tennis and spend time training in the United States. She was coached by her father, Yasuhiko Ishizu.

Ishizu participated at the 2013 Summer Universiade in Kazan winning the gold medal in the singles and the team competition.

Her final appearance on the ITF Circuit took place in Hamamatsu, Japan in October 2015.

ITF Circuit finals

Singles: 13 (9–4)

Doubles: 4 (1–3)

External links
 
 

1992 births
Living people
Japanese female tennis players
People from Tsuchiura
Sportspeople from Ibaraki Prefecture
Tennis players at the 2010 Summer Youth Olympics
Universiade medalists in tennis
Universiade gold medalists for Japan
Medalists at the 2011 Summer Universiade
Medalists at the 2013 Summer Universiade